Chance Barrow (born April 22, 1989) is an American professional wrestler currently signed to WWE where he performs for the NXT brand under the ring name Andre Chase. He was previously known by the ring name Harlem Bravado where he teamed with his brother Lance Bravado working for Ring of Honor and Pro Wrestling Noah as the Bravado Brothers.

Professional wrestling career

Ring of Honor (2008–2012)

Barrow and his older brother Houston trained at Ring of Honor (ROH)'s Wrestling Academy under the tutelage of Delirious in 2008.

Barrow debuted for ROH in September 2009 as Harlem Bravado alongside his brother Lance Bravado as The Bravado Brothers, and over the next several months they competed in dark matches, facing wrestlers including Tony Kozina and Anthony Nese. Their first match as part of the main roster was at the 8th Anniversary Show, where they were defeated by The Kings of Wrestling (Chris Hero and Claudio Castagnoli). They entered the Tag Wars 2010 tournament, reaching the semi-finals before losing to the Dark City Fight Club of Kory Chavis and Jon Davis. Following losses to teams including Future Shock (Adam Cole and Kyle O'Reilly) and Grizzly Redwood and Andy Ridge, they developed a winning streak beginning in January 2011, which lasted until they were beaten by Future Shock at Supercard of Honor VI on May 21. At Tag Team Turmoil 2011, the Bravados entered the tournament to determine the next challengers to the ROH World Tag Team Championship. They defeated the Briscoe Brothers (Jay and Mark Briscoe), but lost to Future Shock in the final. On September 17, the Bravado Brothers appeared on their first ROH pay-per-view Death Before Dishonor IX, when they were part of a three-way elimination match against The Young Bucks and Future Shock; the Bravados were the first team eliminated. In November, the duo lost to the Briscoe Brothers in a qualifying match for the Survival of the Fittest tournament. At the Final Battle 2011 pay-per-view, the Bravado Brothers were part of a tag team gauntlet match to determine the number one contenders to the ROH World Tag Team Championship, but were the first team eliminated by Caprice Coleman and Cedric Alexander.

The Bravado Brothers returned to ROH at Unity in April 2012, defeating The Young Bucks. The following month, they challenged Wrestling's Greatest Tag Team (Shelton Benjamin and Charlie Haas) for the ROH World Tag Team Championship. They won the match by disqualification, and so did not win the championship. They competed only sporadically for ROH throughout mid-2012, including a loss to Coleman and Alexander at Glory By Honor XI, which was their last ROH appearance.

Independent promotions (2011–2021)

On November 12, 2011, The Bravado Brothers debuted for Chikara, losing to 3.0 (Scott Parker and Shane Matthews). Throughout 2012, they made sporadic appearances for the promotion, including participating in the 2012 torneo cibernetico on November 18, as part of Team Kevin Steen. On May 18, 2013, the Bravados returned to take part in the 2013 Tag World Grand Prix, but were eliminated in the first round by The Batiri (Kodama and Obariyon).

In 2013, Harlem alongside Lance Bravado began working for the Evolve promotion. On May 30, they defeated Maxwell Chicago and Sugar Dunkerton at Evolve 20 and the following day at Evolve 21, they defeated Derek Ryze and Andrew Everett. On June 2, at Evolve 22, they teamed with Everett in a loss to Dos Ben Dejos and Shane Strickland.

On July 5, at the Declaration of Independence internet pay-per-view, Harlem won the FIP Tag Team Championship alongside Lance Bravado in a three-way match against Dos Ben Dejos and KOA (Sugar Dunkerton and Aaron Epic). On November 16, the Bravado Brothers defeated The Young Bucks to win Dragon Gate USA's Open the United Gate Championship. On December 6, they lost the FIP Tag Team Championship to Rich Swann and Roderick Strong. On September 14, 2014, at Evolve 35, The Bravado Brothers lost the Open the United Gate Championship to Anthony Nese and Caleb Konley in a three-way match, also involving A.R. Fox and Rich Swann. In 2017, Lance Bravado retired from wrestling while Harlem Bravado continued to wrestle as a singles wrestler on the independent circuit mainly for Evolve Wrestling before he signed with WWE in 2021.

Pro Wrestling Noah (2012–2013)
In January 2012 Harlem and his brother Lance Bravado moved to Japan for three months to train with and compete for Pro Wrestling Noah. While at Noah, Harlem mostly competed in singles matches, but also teamed up sporadically with Lance Bravado.

Total Nonstop Action Wrestling (2016)
In December 2016, Harlem appeared in the special Impact Wrestling episode "Total Nonstop Deletion" alongside Lance Bravado as The Bravado Brothers as entrants in the Tag Team Apocalypto for the TNA Tag Team Championship.

WWE (2021–present)
In February 2021, it was announced that Harlem Bravado had signed with WWE and would be reporting to the WWE Performance Center.

On the July 2, 2021 episode of 205 Live, he made his debut under the ring name Andre Chase defeating Guru Raaj to qualify for the NXT Breakout Tournament. On the July 20 episode of NXT, he was defeated by Odyssey Jones in the first round.

On the September 21 episode of NXT, Chase debuted a new heel teacher persona and began hosting a segment on the show called Andre Chase University. He began feuding with Odyssey Jones after mocking him for losing in the Breakout Tournament and costing him a match against LA Knight. Over the next few months, Chase would recruit Bodhi Hayward and Thea Hail as his new students for Chase University and would slowly turn face. On the September 20, 2022 episode of NXT, Chase and Hayward would pick up a victory over Carmelo Hayes and Trick Williams. This earned Chase a North American Title match qualifier against Von Wagner on the October 4 episode of NXT but he was defeated. 

In November, Hayward was released from his WWE contract, thus removing him from Chase University. On the November 1 episode of NXT, Duke Hudson would join Chase University accompanying Andre Chase and Thea Hail as Chase U's flag bearer and would save Chase from an attack by Charlie Dempsey. Chase made his first main roster appearance during the December 19 episode of Raw, where he was seen as one of the wrestlers getting beaten down by The Bloodline backstage. On the January 31 episode of NXT, Chase and Hudson defeated The Dyad and Edris Enofe and Malik Blade to earn a spot in the Fatal 4 Way match for the NXT Tag Team Championship at NXT Vengeance Day. At the event, Chase U were unsuccessful in capturing the titles.

Championships and accomplishments
 All Star Wrestling
 ASW British Heavyweight Championship (1 time)
 Battle Zone
 Battle Zone United States Championship (1 time)
Dragon Gate USA
Open the United Gate Championship (1 time) – with Lancelot Bravado
Full Impact Pro
FIP Tag Team Championship (1 time) – with Lancelot Bravado
Pro Wrestling Illustrated
Ranked No. 281 of the top 500 wrestlers in the PWI 500 in 2012
Premiere Wrestling Xperience
PWX Tag Team Championship (2 times) – with Lancelot Bravado
Wrestle Force
Wrestle Force Tag Team Championship (1 time) – with Lancelot Bravado

References

External links
 
 

1989 births
Living people
American male professional wrestlers
Professional wrestlers from North Carolina
People from Eden, North Carolina
21st-century professional wrestlers